The Rivals is a comedy of manners by Richard Brinsley Sheridan in five acts which was first performed at Covent Garden Theatre on 17 January 1775. The story has been updated frequently, including a 1935 musical and a 1958 episode of the TV series Maverick (see below) starring James Garner and Roger Moore, with attribution.

History

Production 
The Rivals was Sheridan's first play. At the time, he was a young newlywed living in Bath. At Sheridan's insistence, upon marriage his wife Eliza (born Elizabeth Linley) had given up her career as a singer. This was proper for a gentleman's wife, but it was difficult because Eliza would have earned a substantial income as a performer. Instead, the Sheridans lived beyond their means as they entertained the gentry and nobility with Eliza's singing (in private parties) and Richard's wit. Finally, in need of funds, Richard turned to the only craft that could gain him the remuneration he desired in a short time: he began writing a play.  He had over the years written and published essays and poems, and among his papers were numerous unfinished plays, essays and political tracts, but never had he undertaken such an ambitious project as this. In a short time, however, he completed The Rivals.

Reception 
The Rivals was first performed at Covent Garden, London, on 17 January 1775, with comedian Mary Bulkley as Julia Melville. It was roundly vilified by both the public and the critics for its length, for its bawdiness and for the character of Sir Lucius O'Trigger being a meanly written role played very badly. The actor, John Lee, after being hit with an apple during the performance, stopped and addressed the audience, asking "By the pow'rs, is it personal? — is it me, or the matter?"  Apparently, it was both. Sheridan immediately withdrew the play and in the next 11 days, rewrote the original (the Larpent manuscript) extensively, including a new preface in which he allowed:

For my own part, I see no reason why the author of a play should not regard a first night's audience as a candid and judicious friend attending, in behalf of the public, at his last rehearsal. If he can dispense with flattery, he is sure at least of sincerity, and even though the annotation be rude, he may rely upon the justness of the comment.

Sheridan also apologised for any impression that O'Trigger was intended as an insult to Ireland.  Rewritten and with a new actor, Laurence Clinch, in the role of O'Trigger, the play reopened on 28 January to significant acclaim.  Indeed, it became a favourite of the royal family, receiving five command performances in ten years, and also in the Colonies (it was George Washington's favourite play). It became a standard show in the repertoires of 19th-century companies in England and the US.

The play is now considered to be one of Sheridan's masterpieces, and the term malapropism was coined in reference to one of the characters in the play. She was first played by Jane Green.

Characters

 Sir Anthony Absolute, a wealthy baronet
 Captain Jack Absolute, his son, disguised as Ensign Beverley
 Faulkland, friend of Jack Absolute
 Bob Acres, friend of Jack Absolute
 Sir Lucius O'Trigger, an Irish baronet
 Fag, Captain Absolute's servant
 David, Bob Acres' servant
 Thomas, Sir Anthony's servant
 Lydia Languish, a wealthy teenaged heiress, in love with "Ensign Beverley"
 Mrs. Malaprop, Lydia's middle-aged guardian
 Julia Melville, a young relation of the Absolutes, in love with Faulkland
 Lucy, Lydia's conniving maid

Plot 
The play is set in 18th-century Bath, a town that was legendary for conspicuous consumption and fashion at the time. Wealthy, fashionable people went there to "take the waters", which were believed to have healing properties. Bath society was much less exclusive than London, and hence it provides an ideal setting for the characters.

The plot centres on the two young lovers, Lydia and Jack. Lydia, who reads a lot of popular novels of the time, wants a purely romantic love affair. To court her, Jack pretends to be "Ensign Beverley", a poor army officer. Lydia is enthralled with the idea of eloping with a poor soldier in spite of the objections of her guardian, Mrs. Malaprop, a moralistic widow. Mrs. Malaprop is the chief comic figure of the play, thanks to her continual misuse of words that sound like the words she intends to use, but mean something completely different (the term malapropism was coined in reference to the character).

Lydia has two other suitors: Bob Acres (a somewhat buffoonish country gentleman), and Sir Lucius O'Trigger, an impoverished and combative Irish gentleman. Sir Lucius pays Lucy to carry love notes between him and Lydia (who uses the name "Delia"), but Lucy is swindling him: "Delia" is actually Mrs. Malaprop.

As the play opens, Sir Anthony arrives suddenly in Bath. He has arranged a marriage for Jack, but Jack demurs, saying he is in love already. They quarrel violently. But Jack soon learns through the gossip of Lucy and Fag that the marriage arranged by Sir Anthony is, in fact, with Lydia. He makes a great show of submission to his father, and is presented to Lydia with Mrs. Malaprop's blessing. Jack confides to Lydia that he is only posing as Sir Anthony's son. She annoys Mrs. Malaprop by loudly professing her eternal devotion to "Beverley" while rejecting "Jack Absolute".

Jack's friend Faulkland is in love with Julia, but he suffers from jealous suspicion. He is constantly fretting himself about her fidelity. Faulkland and Julia quarrel foolishly, making elaborate and high-flown speeches about true love that satirise the romantic dramas of the period.

Bob Acres tells Sir Lucius that another man ("Beverley") is courting the lady of Acres' choice (Lydia, though Sir Lucius does not know this). Sir Lucius immediately declares that Acres must challenge "Beverley" to a duel and kill him. Acres goes along, and writes out a challenge note – despite his own rather more pacifist feelings, and the profound misgivings of his servant David. Sir Lucius leaves, Jack arrives, and Acres tells him of his intent. Jack agrees to deliver the note to "Beverley", but declines to be Acres' second.

Mrs. Malaprop again presents Jack to Lydia, but this time with Sir Anthony present, exposing Jack's pose as "Beverley". Lydia is enraged by the puncturing of her romantic dreams, and spurns Jack contemptuously.

Sir Lucius has also learned of the proposed marriage of Jack and Lydia, and determines to challenge Jack. He meets Jack, who, smarting from Lydia's rejection, agrees to fight him without even knowing the reason. They will meet at the same time as Acres is scheduled to fight "Beverley".

At the duelling ground, Acres is very reluctant to fight, but Sir Lucius will have no shirking. Jack and Faulkland arrive. Acres learns that "Beverley" is actually his friend Jack, and begs off from their duel. However, Jack is quite willing to fight Sir Lucius, and they cross swords.

David informs Mrs. Malaprop, Lydia, Julia, and Sir Anthony of the duel, and they all rush off to stop it. Sir Lucius explains the cause of his challenge, but Lydia denies any connection to him, and admits her love for Jack. Mrs. Malaprop announces that she is Delia, but Sir Lucius recoils in horror, realising that he has been hoaxed. Sir Anthony consoles Mrs. Malaprop, Julia is reconciled to Faulkland, and Acres invites everyone to a party.

Adaptations

Musical (1935) 

A successful musical production - titled Rivals!, with songs by Herbert Hughes and lyrics by John Robert Monsell - was staged by Vladimir Rosing at London's Kingsway Theatre in October 1935. The musical ran for 86 performances.Queen Mary attended one of the performances.

Maverick television adaptation (1958) 

The play was rewritten as a 1958 episode of the comedic Western television series Maverick, starring the remarkably similar-looking James Garner and Roger Moore, and was the only episode of the series in which Garner and Moore appeared together (Moore did not portray "Beau Maverick," Bret Maverick's cousin, until after Garner had left the series two seasons later). The Absolutes were renamed "Vandergelt" with Neil Hamilton as the wealthy father.  Patricia "Pat" Crowley plays the leading lady, whose name is changed from the original play's "Lydia Languish" to "Lydia Lynley." The episode, telecast midway through the series' second season, was called "The Rivals" and the playwright Sheridan was given due credit.

Radio production
In 1962, a radio production by R. D. Smith for the BBC Third Programme featured Fay Compton as Mrs Malaprop, Baliol Holloway as Sir Anthony Absolute, Fenella Fielding as Lydia Languish, Hugh Burden as Captain Absolute and John Hollis as Thomas. It was repeated on 23 December 1963 on the Home Service as part of the "National Theatre of the Air" series.

Additional television productions 
The play was adapted for Australian television in 1961.

The BBC produced a version which was broadcast in 1970 as part of their Play of the Month series, starring Jeremy Brett as Captain Jack Absolute.  Another BBC production was broadcast in 1989 as part of their Theatre Night series, starring Donald Sinden as Sir Anthony Absolute.

Jack Absolute novels (2003–2006) 
The leading character of the play was taken to be the identity of the hero of a series of historic fictional adventure books by actor/novelist Chris Humphreys. These take place in Cornwall, London, Quebec, the American colonies during both the Seven Years' War and the American Revolution, and Portugal.

Jack Absolute Flies Again 

A new adaptation written by Richard Bean and Oliver Chris titled Jack Absolute Flies Again was due to premiere at the National Theatre, London in April 2020, however due to the  COVID-19 pandemic, the production eventually opened on 15 July 2022. The play has been updated to July 1940 to coincide with the 80th anniversary of the Battle of Britain.

Biographical sources 

 Richard Brinsley Sheridan, The Rivals (New Mermaids 1979, Elizabeth Duthie, Ed.).
 Linda Kelly, Richard Brinsley Sheridan, A Life (Sinclair-Stevenson 1997).
 Brooke Allen,  The Scholar of Scandal, a review of Fintan O’Toole, The Traitor's Kiss: The Life of Richard Brinsley Sheridan, 1751–1816 (Farrar, Straus & Giroux 1998), at New Criterion.
 Richard Brinsley Sheridan (1751–1816) at Theatre History.

References

External links 

Full text of The Rivals at Project Gutenberg

 

Plays by Richard Brinsley Sheridan
1775 plays
Plays set in the 18th century